The Crescenta Valley is a small inland valley in Los Angeles County, California, lying between the San Gabriel Mountains on the northeast and the Verdugo Mountains and San Rafael Hills on the southwest. It opens into the San Fernando Valley at the northwest and the San Gabriel Valley at the southeast. It is nearly bisected by the Verdugo Wash, a smaller valley separating the Verdugo Mountains from the San Rafael Hills.  Most of the valley lies at an elevation of over 1,500 feet (450 m).

History
The Crescenta Valley was a pastoral area under the Rancho Tujunga, Rancho San Rafael and Rancho La Cañada land grants during the Spanish and Mexican periods.  The first American settler in the valley was Theodore Pickens, who settled at the top of today's Briggs Avenue in 1871.  The western portion of Rancho La Cañada, which included the major portion of the valley, was subdivided in 1881 into 10-acre parcels by Dr. Benjamin B. Briggs. Significant suburban residential development began with the opening of the Montrose subdivision in 1913, accelerating significantly after World War II.  Today, the Crescenta Valley is a mature suburban area.

The name "Crescenta" does not derive from the Spanish word for "crescent", which is el creciente.  Benjamin Briggs coined the name from the English word "crescent" because he could see three crescent-shaped formations from his home, or because of the shape of the valley.  The post office was established in 1888, with the Post Office adding the "La" to the name to distinguish it from Crescent City, California.

Communities
Incorporated cities, districts of Los Angeles, districts of Glendale,  and unincorporated census-designated places in the Crescenta Valley include:

 City of La Cañada Flintridge
 Crescenta Highlands (also known as "Glendale Annex"): City of Glendale
 La Crescenta-Montrose: unincorporated LA county & City of Glendale
 Montrose: City of Glendale
 Sunland: City of Los Angeles
 Tujunga: City of Los Angeles
 Verdugo City: City of Glendale

Weather

Daytime temperatures are generally 10 to 15 °F (6 to 8 °C) warmer than those in coastal regions during summer. Winter is somewhat colder than most L.A. area stations. Winter snow is rare, but not unknown on the valley floor. Because of proximity to the mountains, rainfall is generally higher than most Los Angeles area locations, averaging around 20 inches per year, mostly falling between November and March.

References

External links
 Crescenta Valley Chamber of Commerce
 Historical Society of Crescenta Valley
 Crescenta Valley Weekly

 
Geography of Los Angeles
Geography of the San Fernando Valley
Geography of the San Gabriel Valley
Glendale, California
La Cañada Flintridge, California
Los Angeles County, California regions
San Gabriel Mountains
San Rafael Hills
Sunland-Tujunga, Los Angeles
Valleys of California
Valleys of Los Angeles County, California
Verdugo Mountains